The 1954–55 Hapoel Haifa season was the club's 32nd season since its establishment in 1924, and 7th since the establishment of the State of Israel.

During the season, the club competed in Liga Alef (top division) and the State Cup.

Review and events
 The club played one international friendly match during the season, against Beşiktaş, on 25 September 1954. At the match the club was strengthened with players from Hapoel Kiryat Haim and Hapoel Tirat HaCarmel and was billed as Haifa Region Hapoel XI. Beşiktaş won the match 1–2, Mordechai Martin scoring the lone goal for the hosts.

Match Results

Legend

Liga Alef
 
League matches began on 6 February 1955, and by the time the season, only 20 rounds of matches were completed, delaying the end of the league season to the next season.

League table (as of 2 July 1955)

Source:

Matches

Results by match

State Cup

References
1954/55 Season Hapoel-Haifa.com 

 

Hapoel Haifa F.C. seasons
Hapoel Haifa